Krisztian Gardos (born 6 April 1975) is a Hungarian-born Austrian para table tennis player. In 2016, he won the bronze medal in the men's individual C10 event at the 2016 Summer Paralympics held in Rio de Janeiro, Brazil. He competed at the 2020 Summer Paralympics in Tokyo, Japan.

He is the older brother of Robert Gardos who is a table tennis player in Austria's national team.

References

External links 
 

1975 births
Living people
Table tennis players from Budapest
Sportspeople from Innsbruck
Paralympic table tennis players of Austria
Table tennis players at the 2016 Summer Paralympics
Table tennis players at the 2020 Summer Paralympics
Medalists at the 2016 Summer Paralympics
Paralympic bronze medalists for Austria
Paralympic medalists in table tennis
Hungarian emigrants to Austria
Austrian male table tennis players